The Opposition Research Group refers to the division within the Republican National Committee formed in 1984 with its own budget of $1.1 million, to create a master data bank of computerized voter research and opposition research. These staff amassed information on eight Democratic presidential candidates based on data from voting records, Congressional Record speeches, media clippings and transcripts, campaign materials, all of which was stored on a computer for easy access. In this way the party was able to track inconsistencies of its opponents and attack them.  This original data base evolved into a network that linked information gleaned by Republicans in all 50 states, creating a master data base accessible to high-ranking Republican staff, even aboard Air Force One when Ronald Reagan was president. 

In the 1992 presidential election, independent candidate Ross Perot repeatedly accused the Republicans of "dirty tricks" and spying on him, but Republicans dismissed Perot's accusations as a "paranoid fantasy."  At the time, David Tell, who headed the O.R.G. at the time said, "Mr. Perot is suggesting we are sitting here in the middle of this great spider web, calling newspaper reporters and planting these things, and that is baloney."

Notes 

Opposition research
Republican National Committee